Barbara Stöckl (born 24 October 1956) is an Austrian cross-country skier. She competed in two events at the 1976 Winter Olympics.

Cross-country skiing results

Olympic Games

References

1956 births
Living people
Austrian female cross-country skiers
Olympic cross-country skiers of Austria
Cross-country skiers at the 1976 Winter Olympics
Sportspeople from Tyrol (state)
20th-century Austrian women